Afropolitan Vibes is a live music concert series & annual music festival in Lagos, Nigeria. The show was created by  Ade Bantu and Abby Ogunsanya in 2013 as a platform to showcase alternative music. Every edition features three or four contemporary singer/songwriters, vocalists or musicians who perform mostly original works that are firmly rooted in African musical origins of Afrobeat, Afrofunk, Afro-hiphop, Afro-pop, and Highlife. 
All acts perform with the 13 piece BANTU collective No miming is allowed at the shows. From 2013 to 2017 Afropolitan Vibes had a monthly residency at Freedom Park, a former British Colonial Prison on Lagos Island. In May 2017 the producers of the show announced a change of venue to Muri Okunola Park in Lagos and that the concert series would now hold every third Friday of each quarter

Notable performers
A cross section of performers that have performed at Afropolitan Vibes at least once. 
Burna Boy

Victor Olaiya
Yemi Alade
M.I
Shina Peters
Nneka
Falz
Blitz the Ambassador
Gyedu-Blay Ambolley
Patrice
Seun Kuti
Brymo
keziah Jones
Bez
Daddy Showkey
Salawa Abeni
Temi Dollface
Ebo Taylor
Megaloh
Akua Naru
Orlando Juliu
Siji
General Pype
Majek Fashek
Chris Ajilo
Fokn Bois
Beautiful Nubia
Praiz
Waje
Sound Sultan

Afropolitan Vibes Music Festival
The maiden edition of a two day Afropolitan Vibes Festival was held on the 16th and 17 December 2016 in Lagos.

Urban Sessions
The Afropolitan Vibe franchise also hosts smaller acoustic gigs called Urban Sessions. The show happens on an ad hoc basis and has featured Afro-German singer/songwriter Patrice, Nigerian vocalist Brymo & Nigerian folk legend Blackman Akeeb Kareem.
Urban Session was also featured as an integral part of the Afropolitan Vibes Music Festival. Singer/songwriters Falana, Aduke, Ayo Awosika, Mary Akpa, Nosa, Tomi Thomas, Keziah Jones, Kaline, Sina Ayinde Bakare, Jinmi Abdul and female vocal ensemble Adunni & Nefertiti all performed intimate unplugged or acoustic set. The performing acts were all interviewed by Ade Bantu before their respective sets

See also
Afrophilia
Afrophilya

References

External links
Theguardian.com
Thisdaylive.com
Ngrguardiannews.com
Bbc.com

Entertainment events in Nigeria
Nigerian music
DIY culture
Underground culture
Music festivals in Lagos
Annual events in Lagos